Robar may refer to
Filip Robar Dorin (born 1940), Slovenian film director, screenwriter, and film editor 
Mitja Robar (born 1983), Slovenian ice hockey player 
Robar RC-50, American counter-sniper rifle

Slovene-language surnames